Kenneth Michael King (January 26, 1952 – March 11, 2020) was a Canadian sports executive. He was the vice chairman of Calgary Sports and Entertainment, as well as alternate governor of the Calgary Flames in the NHL. He was the chairman and governor of the Calgary Stampeders of the Canadian Football League (CFL), and the Calgary Hitmen's governor of the Western Hockey League (WHL).

Ken King died on March 11, 2020, at the age of 68 from cancer.

Awards and honours
2005 - Alberta Centennial Medal for outstanding contributions to the province of Alberta. 
2012 - Honorary degree from the University of Calgary
2014 - Honorary degree from Mount Royal University

References

External links
Ken King's staff profile at Eliteprospects.com

1952 births
2020 deaths
Calgary Flames executives
Calgary Sports and Entertainment